The 1928 Georgia Tech Golden Tornado football team represented the Georgia Institute of Technology (commonly known as Georgia Tech) during the 1928 Southern Conference football season. The team, which was a member of the Southern Conference (SoCon), was coached by William Alexander in his ninth year as head coach. Alexander compiled a record of 10–0 (7–0 SoCon) and outscored his opponents 213 to 40. Georgia Tech played its home games at Grant Field.

The team was selected national champion by Berryman, Billingsley, Boand, Football Research, Helms, Houlgate, NCF, Poling, and Sagarin (ELO-Chess), while Parke Davis named them co-champion as shared with Detroit. Additionally, USC also earned recognition under the Dickinson System.  USC declined the 1929 Rose Bowl invitation, resulting in a matchup of California and Georgia Tech.  The game was decided by a safety, which was scored after Cal's Roy "Wrong Way" Riegels ran  in the wrong direction.

Several Georgia Tech players received postseason honors. Captain and center Peter Pund was a consensus All-American. Coach Knute Rockne said of Tech's 13–0 defeat of Notre Dame, "I sat at Grant Field and saw a magnificent Notre Dame team suddenly recoil before the furious pounding of one man–Peter Pund".  Tackle Frank Speer was also selected as a first-team All-American by the Associated Press.

Before the season
After the defeat of the Georgia Bulldogs' 1927 Dream and Wonder team, Georgia Tech returned all but one of its key players. Alabama coach Wallace Wade said Georgia Tech, Georgia, and Vanderbilt had the best chances of winning a southern title. Georgia Tech head coach William Alexander held daily scrimmages.

The Golden Tornado was led by center and senior captain Peter Pund, who was never penalized, and was a key player on defense. Halfback Warner Mizell headed a powerful backfield that also included Stumpy Thomason and Father Lumpkin.

Schedule

Season summary

V. M. I.

Sources:

Georgia Tech opened the season on October 6 with a 13–0 defeat of the VMI Keydets, in a game marred by fumbles in every quarter. Tech gained 307 yards and VMI 159. The Georgia Tech line "tore the V. M. I. line to shreds" and all members of the backfield played well. W. R. Tichenor was umpire. Georgia Tech's starting lineup was Holland (left end), Thrash (left tackle), Westbrook (left guard), Pund (center), Drennon (right guard), Speer (right tackle), Waddey (right end), Durant (quarterback), Mizell (left halfback), Thomason (right halfback), and Randolph (fullback).

Tulane

Sources:

In the second week of play, Georgia Tech scored twice on forward passes to beat the Tulane Green Wave 12–0. The first one came in the second quarter; Warner Mizell threw a  pass to Tom Jones. The second came in the fourth quarter on a pass from Dunlap to Stumpy Thomason. Georgia Tech started the second half of the game with a fierce drive down to the  line when Randolph fumbled the ball away.

Notre Dame

Sources:

Georgia Tech next defeated coach Knute Rockne's Notre Dame Fighting Irish 13–0. Father Lumpkin intercepted two Irish passes, setting up the winning score by running the second interception down to the  line. After the game, coach Rockne said, "I sat at Grant Field and saw a magnificent Notre Dame team suddenly recoil before the furious pounding of one man–Peter Pund ... Nobody could stop him. I counted 20 scoring plays that this man ruined". Rockne later also wrote of an attack on his coaching in the Atlanta Journal, "I am surprised that a paper of such fine, high standing [as yours] would allow a zipper to write in his particular vein ... the article by Fuzzy Woodruff was not called for".

Tech's backfield coach Don Miller was a former player of Rockne's, one of the "Four Horsemen". As coach Alexander explained, "Coach Miller knows the Notre Dame offense of Knute Rockne as well as any man alive. It's virtually the same offense that Kid Woodruff has at Georgia."

Georgia Tech's starting lineup was Holland (left end), Maree (left tackle), Westbrook (left guard), Pund (center), Drennon (right guard), Speer (right tackle), Waddey (right end), Durant (quarterback), Mizell (left halfback), Thomason (right halfback), and Randolph (fullback).

North Carolina

Sources:

The Golden Tornado then invaded North Carolina for the first time and beat the Tar Heels 20–7. Georgia Tech started the game with its second stringers, which seemed to perform sufficiently.

Four minutes into the game, Earl Dunlap hit Tom Jones with a  touchdown pass. The next score came when Fitzgerald cut back on a  touchdown run. The third was a short run Dunlap set up by a pass to Holland. In the second half, Tech made two first downs to ten for North Carolina. Georgia Tech's starting lineup was Jones (left end), Watkins (left tackle), Westbrook (left guard), Pund (center), Drennon (right guard), Speer (right tackle), Waddey (right end), Durant (quarterback), Mizell (left halfback), Thomason (right halfback), and Randolph (fullback).

Oglethorpe

Sources:

Georgia Tech defeated the local Oglethorpe Stormy Petrels 32–7. Light rain kept the attendance at 8,000.  After a 7–7 tie in the first half, the Petrels were smothered "under an avalanche of off tackle plays" in the second; their touchdown drive having used up all of their energy. Cy Bell was Oglethorpe's star.

Stumpy Thomason had multiple long gains.  Tech gained  to Oglethorpe's . W. R. Tichenor was umpire. Georgia Tech's starting lineup was Jones (left end), Thrash (left tackle), Edwards (left guard), Pund (center), Brooke (right guard), Speer (right tackle), Waddey (right end), Durant (quarterback), Wilson (left halfback), Thomason (right halfback), and Randolph (fullback).

Vanderbilt

Sources:

Georgia Tech ended the Jimmy Armistead-led Vanderbilt Commodores' hopes of a southern title with a 19–7 victory. The ground-gaining of Thomason, Lumpkin, and Mizell carried Georgia Tech.

Georgia Tech's first touchdown came on a  pass from Tom Jones to Warner Mizell on a triple pass play. Georgia Tech's next score came on an end run from Mizell.  Vanderbilt's lone score came on an  run by lineman Bull Brown after picking up a Stumpy Thomason fumble. The last score was a short run by Lumpkin. W. R. Tichenor was field judge. Georgia Tech's starting lineup was Jones (left end), Maree (left tackle), Westbrook (left guard), Pund (center), Drennon (right guard), Speer (right tackle), Waddey (right end), Schulman (quarterback), Mizell (left halfback), Lumpkin (right halfback), and Randolph (fullback).

Alabama

Sources:

Tech defeated coach Wallace Wade's Alabama Crimson Tide 33–13, scoring three times in the final period to break a 13–13 tie at the half. Coach Alexander gave his team a fiery halftime speech, drawing up defensive plays.

Warner Mizell scored first when he went back to punt, but fumbled the snap, and picked it up and ran it . In the fourth quarter, Alabama drove to Tech's  line when Tony Holm, who had been playing his greatest game, suffered a fractured rib. Georgia Tech took over and the deadlock was eventually broken when Stumpy Thomason ran . Later, Mizell passed to Thomason for another touchdown. The final score came on an interception from Bob Durant returned .

Georgia Tech's starting lineup was Jones (left end), Maree (left tackle), Westbrook (left guard), Pund (center), Drennon (right guard), Speer (right tackle), Waddey (right end), Durant (quarterback), Mizell (left halfback), Thomason (right halfback), and Randolph (fullback).

Auburn
Prior to the rivalry game with Auburn, Mizell was stricken with the flu. Tech still won 51–0. Georgia Tech's starting lineup was Jones (left end), Maree (left tackle), Westbrook (left guard), Pund (center), Drennon (right guard), Watkins (right tackle), Waddey (right end), Schulman (quarterback), Fiasst (left halfback), Lumpkin (right halfback), and Randolph (fullback).

Georgia

Sources: 

In the final game of the regular season, Georgia Tech defeated the rival Georgia Bulldogs 20–6. In the third period, Stumpy Thomason twisted for a  run after an exchange of punts.

The same week, the Tennessee Volunteers upset the high-scoring Florida Gators to give Georgia Tech the only claim to the southern championship. Georgia Tech's starting lineup was Jones (left end), Watkins (left tackle), Westbrook (left guard), Pund (center), Drennon (right guard), Thrash (right tackle), Waddey (right end), Durant (quarterback), Mizell (left halfback), Thomason (right halfback), and Lumpkin (fullback).

Post-season

California

Sources:

Under the Dickinson System, USC was recognized as #1 but the 1929 Rose Bowl was contested between the #2 and #3 teams, California and Georgia Tech.  The game was decided by a safety scored after California center Roy "Wrong Way" Riegels ran  in the wrong direction, having picked up a fumble by Stumpy Thomason.

 from Tech's end zone, Riegels was turned around and ran many yards in the wrong direction. Riegels told the Associated Press, "I was running toward the sidelines when I picked up the ball ... I started to turn to my left toward Tech's goal. Somebody shoved me and I bounded right off into a tackler. In pivoting to get away from him, I completely lost my bearings." Teammate and quarterback Benny Lom chased Riegels, screaming at him to stop. Known for his speed, Lom finally caught up with Riegels at California's  line and tried to turn him around, but he was immediately rushed by a wave of Georgia Tech players, and tackled by Frank Waddey and Vance Maree at the  line.  The Bears chose to punt rather than risk a play so close to their own end zone, but Maree blocked Lom's punt for a safety, giving Tech a 2–0 lead.

During Roy's wrong-way run, coach Alexander told his excited players, who were jumping near the team's bench; "Sit down. Sit down. He's just running the wrong way. Every step he takes is to our advantage". Broadcaster Graham McNamee, who was commentating the game on radio, said during Riegels' run; "What am I seeing? What's wrong with me? Am I crazy? Am I crazy? Am I crazy?"

After the play, Riegels was so distraught he had to be persuaded to return to the game for the second half by his head coach Nibs Price.  Riegels said, "Coach, I can't do it. I've ruined you, I've ruined myself, I've ruined the University of California. I couldn't face that crowd to save my life." Coach Price responded by saying "Roy, get up and go back out there—the game is only half over". Riegels did play on; he turned in a strong second-half performance, including blocking a Georgia Tech punt. Lom passed for a touchdown and kicked the extra point, but that was not enough. Georgia Tech won the game and its second national championship 8–7. Its starting lineup was Waddey (left end), Speer (left tackle), Drennon (left guard), Pund (center), Westbrook (right guard), Maree (right tackle), Jones (right end), Durant (quarterback), Thomason (left halfback), Mizell (right halfback), and Lumpkin (fullback).

Awards and honors

Individual
Several Georgia Tech players received post-season honors. Tackle Frank Speer was selected as a first-team All-American by the Associated Press. Center Peter Pund was recognized as a consensus All-American. Halfback Warner Mizell was a second-team All-American and first-team All-Southern. Ends Tom Jones and Frank Waddey, tackle Vance Maree, and guard Raleigh Drennon were also placed on All-Southern teams. Coach Alexander called Drennon "the best all around guard that ever put a cleat into Grant Field."

National champions
Both USC and Georgia Tech claimed national championships for 1928. Georgia Tech was retroactively selected as the national champion by the Berryman QPRS system, Billingsley Report, Boand System, College Football Researchers Association, Helms Athletic Foundation, Houlgate System, National Championship Foundation, Poling System, and Jeff Sagarin's ELO-Chess methodology system, and as a co-national champion by Parke H. Davis. In honor of the Rose Bowl victory,  Stumpy Thomason was given a bear cub by a local businessman. He grew attached to it, would drive it around town, and feed it Coca-Cola.

Personnel

Depth chart
The following chart depicts Tech's lineup during the 1928 season with games started at the position shown in parenthesis. The chart mimics the offense after the jump shift has taken place.

Lettermen

Line

Source:

Backfield

Source:

Substitutes

Line

Source:

Backfield

Source:

Coaching staff
Head coach: William Alexander
Backfield coach: Don Miller
Line coach: Bill Fincher
End coach: Captain Robinson
Managers: L. J. Harris, L. R. Leach

See also
1928 Southern Conference football season
1928 College Football All-Southern Team
1928 College Football All-America Team

Notes

Endnotes

References
 

 
 

Georgia Tech
Georgia Tech Yellow Jackets football seasons
College football national champions
Southern Conference football champion seasons
Rose Bowl champion seasons
College football undefeated seasons
Georgia Tech Golden Tornado football